Çataloluk may refer to:

 Çataloluk, Anamur, a village in the district Anamur, Mersin Province, Turkey

 Çataloluk, Kaş, a village in the district of Kaş, Antalya Province, Turkey